Abdul-Ghaffar Hassan (1913–2007) was a scholar born in Umarpur, India, near Delhi in 1913. Upon the partition of India in 1947 he chose to migrate to the newly founded nation of Pakistan. Hassan died in 2007.

Hassan was involved with the Jamaat-e-Islami Hind from 1941 to 1957 but eventually left due to methodological (manhaj) differences with Abul Ala Maududi regarding the means and ways in which the Islamic State should be established. Maududi was in favor of utilizing elections to achieve his aim while Hassan demanded it be accomplished via educating the masses about their religion. This belief Hassan held in opposition to Maududi would become popularized later on by Muhammad Nasiruddin al-Albani with what he called "al-tasfiya awl-tarbiya]".

References

 
1913 births
2007 deaths
Pakistani Salafis
Salafi Quietists
Pakistani Sunni Muslim scholars of Islam
20th-century Muslim theologians
Muhajir people